Refugee is a 2000 Indian Hindi-language romantic drama film written and directed by J. P. Dutta. It marked the debut of both the leading actors, Abhishek Bachchan and Kareena Kapoor. The film also starred Jackie Shroff, Sunil Shetty and Anupam Kher. Refugee was an average grosser at the box office and was the fifth highest-grossing film of that year.

It is the story of an unnamed Indian Muslim, who helps illegal refugees from India and Pakistan (including modern-day Bangladesh) cross the border through the Great Rann of Kutch. The film is attributed to have been inspired by the short story "Love Across the Salt Desert" by Keki N. Daruwalla.

Plot 
Bihar-based Manzur Ahmad and his family had migrated to East Pakistan after the partitioning of India in 1947. However, after the formation of the state of Bangladesh in 1971, he and several other people were forced to relocate to the western part of Pakistan. To do this by land, they will have to cross India. The route from Dhaka leads to Guwahati in India then to Delhi then to Ajmer then to Bhuj, and then on to Haji Peer in Pakistan.

They get as far as Bhuj, but afterward, they are assisted by an agent known only as "Refugee", who helps them trek their way across the Great Rann of Kutch to Pakistan. Refugee considers his clients as mere items of luggage and refuses to be emotionally involved with them and their stories. Then he meets Nazneen Ahmed, the daughter of Manzur Ahmed, and falls in love with her.

Police on both sides of the border are aware of the illegal refugee traffic and the Indian police regularly question Refugee and his elderly father Jan Muhammad. One day, Refugee helps four men enter the Indian side of the border. These men enlist the help of Mr. Muhammad's other son to get to Delhi. Shortly thereafter, explosions take place in trains, buses, and buildings in the Indian capital.

Refugee crosses the border once again to visit Nazneen. She asks him to take her with him since her father wants her to marry Mohammad Ashraf, a Pakistan Rangers Officer. While crossing the border through the Rann they are captured by Pakistanis rangers. Refugee is beaten and sent to India on a camel. The Indian BSF captures him and gets him treated in the hospital. The Indians inform him that he unknowingly helped terrorists cross into India and caused several deaths. Refugee joins the BSF and fights the terrorists who laid siege to his village.

The film ends with Nazneen giving birth to Refugee's child at the border between the two nations. Indian BSF and Pakistani Rangers personnel discuss the child's nationality in a lighter vein.

Cast 
Abhishek Bachchan as Refugee 
Kareena Kapoor as Nazneen "Naaz" M. Ahmed
Jackie Shroff as Border Security Force Commandant Raghuvir Singh
Suniel Shetty as Pakistan Rangers Lt Col Mohammad Ashraf
Sudesh Berry as Gul Hamid
Anupam Kher as Jan Mohammad
Kulbhushan Kharbanda as Manzur Ahmad
Shadaab Khan as Shadab J. Mohammad
Reena Roy as Amina J. Mohammad
Mukesh Tiwari as Tausif, Pakistani Rangers Officer.
Ashish Vidyarthi as Makkad
Avtar Gill as Atta Mohammad
Vishwajeet Pradhan as BSF Officer
Puneet Issar as Sikh Priest
গীতাৱলী ৰাজকুমাৰী as Salma, Naaz's younger sister

Music 
The music of this movie is composed by Anu Malik and lyrics by Javed Akhtar. Refugee'''s music received two National Film Awards: one for Best Music Direction and the other for Best Lyrics (for the song "Panchhi Nadiyaan". Additionally, Malik also won a Filmfare Special Award for his work in the film. It was one of the highest selling album of the year 2000

Taran Adarsh gave the album 4.5 out of 5 stars and praised the songs by saying "The music touches the heart of every listener. Every moment you feel like a heavenly moment." According to the Indian trade website Box Office India, around 35,00,000 albums were sold.

Locations filmed
The crew having traveled from Mumbai was based at the city of Bhuj and majority of the shooting took place around in the Kutch District of the Indian state of Gujarat including the Great Rann of Kutch (also on BSF controlled "snow-white" Rann within), villages and Border Security Force (BSF) posts in Banni grasslands and the Rann, Lakhpat Fort village, Tera Fort village, a village in southern Kutch, some ancient temples of Kutch, and with parts and a song filmed on set in Mumbai's Kamalistan Studios.

Production
Bipasha Basu was convinced by Jaya Bachchan to play the role of a village belle opposite her son Abhishek Bachchan in J. P. Dutta’s Aakhri Mughal. However the film was shelved, and Dutta changed the script and made Refugee with Kareena Kapoor. Basu was offered a role in Refugee opposite Sunil Shetty, which she declined. Tabu was signed to play a doctor, but her role eventually got scrapped. Dutta initially wanted Akshaye Khanna to play Shadab Khan's role but decided against it as the role was very small.

InspirationRefugee is attributed to have been inspired by the story based around the Great Rann of Kutch by Keki N. Daruwalla titled Love Across The Salt Desert''. It is included as a short-story in the School Standard 11 and 12 syllabus English textbook of NCERT in India.

Accolades

Notes

References

External links
 
 

2000s Hindi-language films
2000 films
Films scored by Anu Malik
Indian war drama films
Refugees in India
India–Pakistan relations in popular culture
Films set in Gujarat
Films shot in Gujarat
Films about illegal immigration
Films based on the Bangladesh Liberation War
Films distributed by Yash Raj Films
Films directed by J. P. Dutta
Military of Pakistan in films
Indian Army in films
War romance films